Chrysoecia is a genus of owlet moths in the family Noctuidae. There are about eight described species in Chrysoecia.

Species
These eight species belong to the genus Chrysoecia:
 Chrysoecia atrolinea (Barnes & McDunnough, 1912)
 Chrysoecia dela
 Chrysoecia gladiola (Barnes, 1907)
 Chrysoecia morga
 Chrysoecia requies Dyar, 1909
 Chrysoecia salacon
 Chrysoecia scira (Druce, 1889)
 Chrysoecia thoracica (H. Edwards, 1884)

References

 Chrysoecia at Markku Savela's Lepidoptera and Some Other Life Forms
 Natural History Museum Lepidoptera genus database

Amphipyrinae